Philippine Hokkien is a dialect of the Hokkien language of the Southern Min branch of the Sinitic family, primarily spoken vernacularly by Chinese Filipinos in the Philippines, where it serves as the local Chinese lingua franca, primarily spoken as an oral language, within the overseas Chinese community in the Philippines and acts as the heritage language of a majority of Chinese Filipinos. The use of Hokkien in the Philippines is influenced by Philippine Spanish, Filipino (Tagalog) and Philippine English. As a local overseas Chinese community lingua franca in the Philippines, the minority Cantonese/Taishanese-descended Chinese Filipinos also learned to speak Philippine Hokkien for business purposes due to its status as "the Chinoy business language" [sic].

Terminology
The term Philippine Hokkien is used when differentiating the variety of Hokkien spoken in the Philippines from those spoken in China, Taiwan, Malaysia, Singapore, Indonesia, and other Southeast Asian countries.

Historically, it was also known in Philippine English, Filipino (Tagalog), and other Philippine languages as Fookien or Fukien across the country, derived from the Chinese postal romanization of the Nanjing court dialect Mandarin reading of Fujian province in China, such as in the old newspaper, The Fookien Times.

The endonym used by speakers of the dialect itself or the Hokkien language in general though is typically, ; Tâi-lô: Lán-nâng-uē / Lán-lâng-uē / Nán-nâng-uē.

Sociolinguistics
Only 12.2% of all ethnic Chinese in the Philippines have a variety of Chinese as their mother tongue. Nevertheless, the vast majority (77%) still retain the ability to understand and speak Hokkien as a second or third language.

History 

From the late 16th century to the early 17th century, Spanish friars in the Philippines, such as the Dominican Order specifically in Manila, produced materials documenting the Hokkien varieties spoken by the Chinese trading community who had settled there in the late 16th century:

Doctrina Christiana en letra y lengua China (1593), a Hokkien translation of the Doctrina Christiana.
Dictionario Hispanico Sinicum (1604), a Spanish-Hokkien dictionary, giving equivalent words, but not definitions.
Bocabulario de la lengua sangleya (c. 1617), a Spanish-Hokkien dictionary, with definitions.
Arte de la Lengua Chiõ Chiu (1620), a grammar written by a Spanish missionary in the Philippines.

These texts appear to record a dialect descended from the Zhangzhou dialect of Hokkien, from the old port of Yuegang (modern-day Haicheng, an old port that is now part of Longhai), which Klöter (2011) calls as Early Manila Hokkien (EMH).

By 1832, Rev. Walter Henry Medhurst still noted in his Hokkien dictionary, originally as an account given by Conrad Malte-Brun (1775-1826) on the province of Hok-këèn (Fujian), that 

However by 1873, Rev. Carstairs Douglas writes in his Hokkien dictionary that 

By 1883, Rev. John Macgowan also records 3 entries explicitly defining Hokkien  in his Hokkien dictionary:

The Chinese community of the Philippines during the Spanish colonial era used to also speak a sort of Spanish pidgin variety known as "Caló Chino Español" in Spanish or "Kastilang tindahan" in Tagalog, especially because the Chinese community before obligates Chinese cabecillas (community leaders) to teach rudimentary Spanish to new Chinese immigrants which was taught in Chinese-owned schools. They could speak these Spanish pidgin varieties after one month which many, especially old timers later became very fluent, albeit some still with accented Spanish. Spanish was prevalent enough among the educated in the Philippines during the Spanish colonial era, that Joseph Earle Stevens, an American that stayed in Manila from 1893-1894 had this to say in his book, "Yesterdays in the Philippines":

By 1941, Vicente Lim publishes a dictionary in Manila, titled "Chinese-English-Tagalog-Spanish Business conversation and social contact with Amoy pronunciation" giving equivalent words in the stated 4 languages, where "Chinese" referred to Amoy Hokkien as used in the Philippines and of course, "Tagalog" being the base of Filipino.

Education
During the late 20th century, despite Standard Chinese (Mandarin) taking the place as the usual Chinese class subject taught in Chinese Filipino schools as the topic of study, some schools had Chinese teachers that used Amoy Hokkien as medium of instruction in order to teach Mandarin Chinese to native-Hokkien-speaking Chinese Filipino students, but decades later around the Marcos Era, regulations became stricter and the medium of instruction for teaching Standard Chinese (Mandarin) in Chinese classes shifted from Amoy Hokkien Chinese to purely Mandarin Chinese (or in some schools to English). Also, due to the increased rural to urban migration of Chinese Filipinos, Chinese Filipino schools in urban areas increased but those in the provinces gradually declined, some closing down or some turning into ordinary Philippine schools, where some tried to preserve their "Chinese" characteristic by instead teaching Hokkien as their Chinese class subject, deeming it as more practical in the Philippine-Chinese setting.

, the Ateneo de Manila University, under their Chinese Studies Programme, offers Hokkien 1 (Chn 8) and Hokkien 2 (Chn 9) as electives. Chiang Kai Shek College offers Hokkien classes in their CKS Language Center.

Linguistic features 

Philippine Hokkien is largely derived from the Jinjiang dialect of Quanzhou but has possibly also absorbed influences from the Amoy dialect of Xiamen and Nan'an dialects of Quanzhou.

Although Philippine Hokkien is generally mutually comprehensible especially with other Quanzhou Hokkien variants, including Singaporean Hokkien and Quanzhou-based Taiwanese Hokkien variants, the local vocabulary, tones, and Filipino or Philippine Spanish and English loanwords as well as the extensive use of contractions and colloquialisms (even those which are now unused or considered archaic or dated in China) can result in confusion among Hokkien speakers from outside of the Philippines.

Some terms have been shortened into one syllable. Examples include:

dī-tsa̍p/lī-tsa̍p > dia̍p/lia̍p ( / ): twenty; 20 (same format for 20–29, i.e. 二十一[21] is "dia̍p-it" 廿一)
saⁿ-tsa̍p > sap: thirty; 30 (same format for 30–39, i.e. 三十二[32] is "sa̍p-dī" 卅二)
sì-tsa̍p > siap: forty; 40 (same format for 40–49, i.e. 四十三[43] is "siap-saⁿ" 卌三)

Vocabulary
Philippine Hokkien, like other Southeast Asian variants of Hokkien (e.g. Singaporean Hokkien, Penang Hokkien, Johor Hokkien and Medan Hokkien), has borrowed words from other languages spoken locally, specifically Spanish, Tagalog and English. Examples include:
 manis : "corn", either from Spanish  or Tagalog 
 lettuce  : "lettuce", from either English  or Spanish lechuga + Hokkien  (chhài, "vegetable")
 pamkin : "pumpkin", from English 
 ka kaó: "cocoa", either from Spanish  or Tagalog 
 ka-pé: "coffee", from Tagalog , which was from Spanish 
 pà-chî: "potato", either from Spanish  or Tagalog  + Hokkien  (chî, "potato")
 kam-á-tit: "tomato", either from Tagalog  or directly from Spanish 
 sap-bûn: "soap", from Early Modern Spanish  or Tagalog 
 lo-sin: "dozen", from English 

Philippine Hokkien also has some vocabulary that is unique to it compared to other varieties of Hokkien:
  : "chauffeur"
  : "country bumpkin"
  : "cemetery" (used in the sign for Manila Chinese Cemetery)
  : "potato"
  : "bread"
  : "hospital"

Hokaglish

Hokaglish is code-switching involving Philippine Hokkien, Tagalog and English. Hokaglish shows similarities to Taglish (mixed Tagalog and English), the everyday mesolect register of spoken Filipino language within Metro Manila and its environs.

Both ways of speaking are very common among Chinese Filipinos, who tend to code-switch these languages in everyday conversation, where it can be observed that older generations typically use the Hokkien Chinese sentence structure base while injecting English and Tagalog words while the younger ones use the Filipino/Tagalog sentence structure as the base while injecting the few Hokkien terms they know in the sentence. The latter therefore, in a similar sense with Taglish using Tagalog grammar and syntax, tends to code-mix via conjugating the Hokkien terms the way they do for Filipino/Tagalog words.

In other provinces/regions of the Philippines, a similar code-switching medium is also done with Philippine Hokkien and English, but instead of or along with Tagalog, other regional languages are used as well, such as Cebuano Bisaya (akin to Bislish), Hiligaynon/Ilonggo, Ilocano, Bikolano, Waray, Kapampangan, Pangasinense, etc.

See also
 Hokkien architecture
 Hokkien culture
 Hokkien media
 Hoklo people
 Holopedia
 Mandarin Chinese in the Philippines
 Medan Hokkien
 Penang Hokkien
 Pe̍h-ōe-jī
 Singapore Hokkien
 Southern Malaysia Hokkien
 Speak Hokkien Campaign
 Taiwanese Hokkien
 Taiwanese Romanization System
 Written Hokkien

Notes

References

Further reading
  - An analysis and facsimile of the Arte de la Lengua Chio-chiu (1620), the oldest extant grammar of Hokkien.
  – Hokkien translation of the Doctrina Christiana.
  – A manual for learning Hokkien written by a Spanish missionary in the Philippines.
 
 

Chinese-Filipino culture

Hokkien-language dialects